Packer House may refer to:

Alonzo Hamilton Packer House, Safford, Arizona, listed on the National Register of Historic Places (NRHP) in Graham County
Packer House (Franklin Lakes, New Jersey), NRHP-listed
Packer Farm and Barkersville Store, Middle Grove, New York, NRHP-listed
Asa Packer Mansion, Jim Thorpe, Pennsylvania, NRHP-listed
Harry Packer Mansion, Jim Thorpe, Pennsylvania, NRHP-listed
Isaac A. Packer Farm, Lock Haven, Pennsylvania, NRHP-listed

See also
Packing house
List of packing houses
Packer (disambiguation)
Packer Memorial Chapel, Bethlehem, Pennsylvania, NRHP-listed
Packer's National Bank Building, Omaha, Nebraska, NRHP-listed